The 1981 enlargement of the European Communities was the second enlargement of what is now the European Union, then the European Communities (EC). Greece acceded to the EEC on 1 January 1981. It is considered a part of the Mediterranean enlargement.

The application for accession was made on July 12, 1975, one year after the restoration of democracy in Greece. In July 1976 negotiations began which ended in May 1979 with the signing of the Treaty of Accession.

Impact

See also
1973 enlargement of the European Communities
1986 enlargement of the European Communities
1995 enlargement of the European Union
2004 enlargement of the European Union
2007 enlargement of the European Union
2013 enlargement of the European Union

References

enlargement of the European Communities
enlargement of the European Communities
Greece and the European Union
enlargement of the European Communities